Salvia cyanescens is a perennial shrub in the Lamiaceae family. It is native to Iran and Turkey, and was introduced to horticulture in 1959. It freely hybridizes in its native habitat with Salvia candidissima.

In mild climates it is evergreen, growing into 1 ft clumps. The gray-green leaves are 2 in long by 1 in wide and covered with hairs. It blooms in summer and late autumn, with delicate 1 in purple-violet flowers growing on 1 ft candelabra-like inflorescences. The epithet, cyanescens, means 'bluish', which is not entirely accurate regarding the flower.

Notes

cyanescens
Flora of Iran
Flora of Turkey
Plants described in 1859
Taxa named by Pierre Edmond Boissier
Taxa named by Benjamin Balansa